Elena Brezányiová (born April 3, 1958 in Partizánske) is a former Czechoslovak/Slovak handball player who competed in the 1980 Summer Olympics.

In 1980 she was part of the Czechoslovak team which finished fifth in the Olympic tournament. She played all five matches and scored six goals.

References

1958 births
Living people
Czechoslovak female handball players
Slovak female handball players
Olympic handball players of Czechoslovakia
Handball players at the 1980 Summer Olympics
People from Partizánske
Sportspeople from the Trenčín Region